Hypotacha indecisa is a species of moth in the family Erebidae. It lives in Somalia, Yemen, India and Pakistan.

References

Moths described in 1858
Hypotacha
Moths of Africa
Moths of Asia